The Lebret Eagles were a Junior "A" team based in Lebret, Saskatchewan, Canada. They used to be members of the Saskatchewan Junior Hockey League.

History
The Lebret Eagles played 8 seasons in the Saskatchewan Junior Hockey League: 1993 - 2001.  In 2001, the team left the league and a year later the franchise was dissolved.  The Lebret Eagles played their home games at the Eagle Dome in Lebret, Saskatchewan.

Season-by-season standings

Playoffs
1994 Lost Preliminary
Yorkton Terriers defeated Lebret Eagles 3-games-to-1
1995 Lost Semi-final
Lebret Eagles defeated Estevan Bruins 4-games-to-1
Weyburn Red Wings defeated Lebret Eagles 4-games-to-none
1996 Lost Quarter-final
Estevan Bruins defeated Lebret Eagles 4-games-to-2
1997 Lost Semi-final
Lebret Eagles defeated Notre Dame Hounds 4-games-to-2
Weyburn Red Wings defeated Lebret Eagles 4-games-to-1
1998 Lost Semi-final
Lebret Eagles defeated Notre Dame Hounds 4-games-to-2
Weyburn Red Wings defeated Lebret Eagles 4-games-to-3
1999 Lost Preliminary
Melville Millionaires defeated Lebret Eagles 2-games-to-none
2000 DNQ
2001 Lost Semi-final
Lebret Eagles defeated Melville Millionaires 4-games-to-2
Weyburn Red Wings defeated Lebret Eagles 4-games-to-1

External links
SJHL Website

Defunct Saskatchewan Junior Hockey League teams
Defunct sports teams in Saskatchewan